William Bernard Brahms (born October 1, 1966) is an American librarian, encyclopedist, author and historian best known for his encyclopedic works on historical "lasts" (as opposed to "firsts"), in particular, the reference works Notable Last Facts: A Compendium of Endings, Conclusions, Terminations and Final Events Throughout History (2005) and Last Words of Notable People: Final Words of More than 3500 Noteworthy People Throughout History (2010). "Last words" and "last facts" are subjects for which his works are cited as an authoritative resources.

Life and work
William B. Brahms was born in Camden, New Jersey and was raised and still lives in Haddon Township, New Jersey. He graduated as a member of Phi Beta Kappa and Cap and Skull from Rutgers College with a B.A. and from Rutgers University Graduate School of Communication Information and Library Studies with an M.L.S. He has spent his entire career working in public libraries in New Jersey. Currently he manages and is Chief Librarian at the Camden County Library. He is also President of Reference Desk Press, Inc. and has published seven books, including the major library reference works Notable Last Facts which was selected as an "Achievement in Publishing" in Booklist's 2005 Editor's Choice issue and the Last Words of Notable People"  which was profiled in Kirkus author Q & A in Kirkus Reviews and Reader's Digest Recommends" and cracked the Amazon.com Top 100 Best Seller list in 2011. Brahms has also written several books on regional history. In particular, his books on Franklin Township, Somerset County, New Jersey including: Franklin Township Somerset County, NJ: A History, and Images of America: Franklin Township. His book on the historic Westmont Theatre in Westmont, New Jersey is a tie-in to the film The Grand Old Lady directed by Brent J. Donaway; a film in which Brahms also appears. He is also co-author of another title in the national Image of America series, Images of America: Haddon Township. about Haddon Township, New Jersey.

External links

 Franklin PhotoArchive co-designed by William B. Brahms
 Franklin NewsArchive designed by William B. Brahms

References 

1966 births
Living people
American information and reference writers
American librarians
American encyclopedists
Rutgers University alumni
Writers from Camden, New Jersey
People from Haddon Township, New Jersey